HMS Pioneer was a 4-gun Intrepid-class gunvessel launched on 19 January 1856 from the Pembroke Dockyard. She saw active service in China and was decommissioned in 1864.

Service history
She was commissioned to the North America and West Indies Station before serving as part of the Channel Squadron. She was then assigned to the East Indies Station and China Station where she participated in the Taiping Rebellion. She was then assigned to the Australia Station in 1862 serving until 1863.

Fate
Upon returning to Plymouth, she was sold to Marshall in October 1864 for breaking in 1865.

Named in her honour 
The Queensland Governor, George Bowen, named the Pioneer River in Queensland, Australia after the ship in which he visited the river in 1862.

References

 

1856 ships
Ships built in Pembroke Dock
Intrepid-class gunvessels